This is a list of mountains in the state of Montana. Montana is the fourth largest state in the United States and is well known for its mountains. The name "Montana" means mountainous in Latin. Representative James Mitchell Ashley (R-Ohio), suggested the name when legislation organizing the territory was passed by the United States Congress in 1864. Ashley noted that a mining camp in the Colorado Territory had already used the name, and Congress agreed to use the name for the new territory.

According to the United States Board on Geographic Names there are at least 2991 named mountains (hills, summits, buttes, peaks, etc.) in Montana. This is a list of lists of named mountain peaks in Montana by county.
 List of mountains in Beaverhead County, Montana
 List of mountains in Big Horn County, Montana
 List of mountains in Blaine County, Montana
 List of mountains in Broadwater County, Montana
 List of mountains in Carbon County, Montana
 List of mountains in Carter County, Montana
 List of mountains in Cascade County, Montana
 List of mountains in Chouteau County, Montana
 List of mountains in Custer County, Montana
 List of mountains in Daniels County, Montana
 List of mountains in Dawson County, Montana
 List of mountains in Deer Lodge County, Montana
 List of mountains in Fallon County, Montana
 List of mountains in Fergus County, Montana
 List of mountains in Flathead County, Montana (A-L)
 List of mountains in Flathead County, Montana (M-Z)
 List of mountains in Gallatin County, Montana
 List of mountains in Garfield County, Montana
 List of mountains in Glacier County, Montana
 List of mountains in Golden Valley County, Montana
 List of mountains in Granite County, Montana
 List of mountains in Hill County, Montana
 List of mountains in Jefferson County, Montana
 List of mountains in Judith Basin County, Montana
 List of mountains in Lake County, Montana
 List of mountains in Lewis and Clark County, Montana
 List of mountains in Liberty County, Montana
 List of mountains in Lincoln County, Montana (A-L)
 List of mountains in Lincoln County, Montana (M-Z)
 List of mountains in Madison County, Montana
 List of mountains in McCone County, Montana
 List of mountains in Meagher County, Montana
 List of mountains in Mineral County, Montana
 List of mountains in Missoula County, Montana
 List of mountains in Musselshell County, Montana
 List of mountains in Park County, Montana
 List of mountains in Petroleum County, Montana
 List of mountains in Phillips County, Montana
 List of mountains in Pondera County, Montana
 List of mountains in Powder River County, Montana
 List of mountains in Powell County, Montana
 List of mountains in Prairie County, Montana
 List of mountains in Ravalli County, Montana
 List of mountains in Richland County, Montana
 List of mountains in Roosevelt County, Montana
 List of mountains in Rosebud County, Montana
 List of mountains in Sanders County, Montana
 List of mountains in Sheridan County, Montana
 List of mountains in Silver Bow County, Montana
 List of mountains in Stillwater County, Montana
 List of mountains in Sweet Grass County, Montana
 List of mountains in Teton County, Montana
 List of mountains in Toole County, Montana
 List of mountains in Treasure County, Montana
 List of mountains in Wheatland County, Montana
 List of mountains in Wibaux County, Montana
 List of mountains in Valley County, Montana
 List of mountains in Yellowstone County, Montana

See also
 List of mountain ranges in Montana
 Mountain passes in Montana (A-L)

Notes